Cergy is a commune in the French department of Val-d'Oise, in northwestern suburbs of Paris.

Although neighbouring Pontoise is the official préfecture (capital) of the Val-d'Oise département, the préfecture building and administration, as well as the department council (conseil général), are located inside the commune of Cergy, which is regarded as the de facto capital of Val-d'Oise. The sous-préfecture building and administration, on the other hand, are located inside the commune of Pontoise.

Name
The name Cergy comes from Medieval Latin Sergiacum, meaning "estate of Sergius", a Gallo-Roman landowner.

Administration

Cergy is the chief town of two cantons: Cergy-1 and Cergy-2.

Twin towns and sister cities
 Columbia, Maryland, United States.
 Erkrath, Germany.
 Liaoyang, People's Republic of China.
 Porto Novo, Benin.
 Tres Cantos, Spain
 West Lancashire, United Kingdom.

Cergy is also informally twinned with a village in Palestine and a village in Senegal.

Demographics
When Cergy was selected to become the center of a "new town", it was only a village. The commune had only 2,895 inhabitants in 1968. It then started to develop very quickly, exceeding 10,000 inhabitants in the mid-1970s and then 20,000 in the early-1980s. It is in this decade that its growth was most spectacular, since the city exceeded 48,000 inhabitants in 1990. The increase continued since, but at a notably slower pace, to reach 54,500 at 2004 estimates. However, in December 2001, the commune lost a portion of its territory (net  with a 1999 population of 62 persons) to the adjacent commune of Courdimanche.

Immigration

Port Cergy

Port Cergy is a marina on the River Oise at pk 9. The site comprises both housing and recreational yachts as well as a boating school. The marina can hold 103 ships ranging 5 to 22m long and. The northern part of the site is reserved for restaurants and shops and have been built around a small bain.

Ham
Ham is a small village to the south of Cergy. The village used to be part of the Sergentery and then commune of Neuville-sur-Oise but has since been amalgamated in the commune of Cergy. On its territory is the outdoor leisure centre 'Base de Loisirs de Cergy-Neuville'.

Transport

Cergy is served by three stations on Paris RER line A and on the Transilien Paris – Saint-Lazare suburban rail line: Cergy-Préfecture, Cergy-Saint-Christophe, and Cergy-le-Haut.
Cergy is served by direct buses from Charles de Gaulle Airport.

The bus company STIVO provides 17 lines of buses to travel within the agglomeration of Cergy.

Education

Secondary schools:
 Junior high schools (collèges): Gérard Philipe, La Justice, Les Explorateurs, Les Touleuses, Moulin à Vent
 Senior high schools/sixth-form colleges: Lycée polyvalent Galilée and Lycée polyvalent Jules Verne

Lycée Alfred Kastler de Cergy-Pontoise is in neighbouring Pontoise.

Tertiary education:
 Cergy-Pontoise University
 CY Tech, formerly EISTI (École internationale des sciences du traitement de l'information)
ESSEC Business School (grande école)
ENSEA École Nationale Supérieure de l'Électronique et de ses Applications
 ITIN, IT-Institute (École supérieure d'informatique, réseaux et systèmes d'information)
 Web site of Professional Bachelor’s degree in International Trade and International Tourism (Cergy-Pontoise University)

Security 
Known as being a violent city in the past, with a criminal rate of 137.62 incidents per 1000 inhabitants, Cergy-Pontoise has experienced a significant decrease of violence in the past years. Reaching, in the year of 2008, a rate of 9,87 criminal incidents per 1000 inhabitants, which is still a high criminal rate.

In popular culture

The town was used as a filming location for Henri Verneuil's film I... comme Icare released in 1979, starring Yves Montand. The EDF-GDF tower designed by architect Renzo Moro is the building from which the shots were fired to assassinate president Marc Jarry.
The country that the movie depicts is not named, although the United States is perhaps suggested.
The filmmakers chose the modern and innovative architecture of the new city to avoid depicting any particular country.

The town was also the location of the 1987 film My Girlfriend's Boyfriend directed by Eric Rohmer.

See also
Communes of the Val-d'Oise department

References

External links

  

Port Cergy 

Communes of Val-d'Oise
Cergy-Pontoise
Prefectures in France